María Sanjuana Cerda Franco (born 22 April 1951) is a Mexican politician affiliated with the PANAL. As of 2013 she served as Deputy of the LXII Legislature of the Mexican Congress representing Nuevo León.

References

1951 births
Living people
Politicians from Monterrey
Women members of the Chamber of Deputies (Mexico)
New Alliance Party (Mexico) politicians
21st-century Mexican politicians
21st-century Mexican women politicians
Deputies of the LXII Legislature of Mexico
Members of the Chamber of Deputies (Mexico) for Nuevo León